William Taylor Sr. (April 3, 1906 – September 2, 1986) was an American jazz bassist. He was born Washington, D.C. and died in Fairfax, Virginia.

Taylor began playing tuba but later picked up bass alongside it. After moving to New York City in 1924, he played with Elmer Snowden (1925), Willie Gant and Arthur Gibbs (1926), Charlie Johnson (1927–29, 1932–33), Duke Ellington (1928), McKinney's Cotton Pickers (1929–31), Fats Waller (1934), and Fletcher Henderson. He recorded with Jelly Roll Morton on three sessions in 1930. From 1935 to 1940, he again played with Ellington, and it is for this association that he is best remembered; he often played with a second bassist in the orchestra, at times Hayes Alvis or Jimmie Blanton. During that time, he also recorded with Cootie Williams and Johnny Hodges. In the 1940s, he played with Coleman Hawkins (1940), Red Allen (1940–41), Joe Sullivan (1942), Raymond Scott (1942–43), Cootie Williams (1944), Barney Bigard (1944–45), Benny Morton (1945), and Cozy Cole (1945). Later in the decade he played freelance in New York before moving back to Washington, D.C. in 1949. He led his own ensemble for Keynote Records in 1944.

Discography

As leader
 Billy Taylor's Big Eight (4 sides, Keynote, 1944) - with Harry Carney and Johnny Hodges

As sideman
With Al Hibbler
After the Lights Go Down Low (Atlantic, 1957)

With Duke Ellington
"Caravan" (Variety VA-515-1, 1936)

References
Leonard Feather and Ira Gitler, The Biographical Encyclopedia of Jazz. Oxford, 1999, pp. 637–38.

External links
 Billy Taylor recordings at the Discography of American Historical Recordings.

1906 births
1986 deaths
American jazz double-bassists
Male double-bassists
Musicians from Washington, D.C.
Duke Ellington Orchestra members
20th-century American musicians
20th-century double-bassists
American male jazz musicians
20th-century American male musicians